Marina Čaljkušić (née Glavan; born 4 June 1991) is a Croatian handball player for RK Lokomotiva Zagreb and the Croatian national team.

She participated at the 2018 European Women's Handball Championship.

International honours
EHF Challenge Cup:
Winner: 2017

References

1991 births
Living people
Sportspeople from Mostar
Croatian female handball players
21st-century Croatian women